Pensarn railway station serves the village of Pensarn in Gwynedd, Wales. The station is an unstaffed halt on the Cambrian Coast Railway with passenger services to Porthmadog, Pwllheli, Barmouth, Machynlleth and Shrewsbury.

The station opened as Pensarn but on 1 April 1885 it was renamed Llanbedr and Pensarn and then on 8 May 1978 it reverted to its original name of Pensarn. Most trains call only on request.

Abergele and Pensarn railway station is on the North Wales Coast Line.

External links

Railway stations in Gwynedd
DfT Category F2 stations
Former Cambrian Railway stations
Railway stations in Great Britain opened in 1867
Railway stations served by Transport for Wales Rail
Railway request stops in Great Britain
Llanfair, Gwynedd